Richard Francis Ault (December 10, 1925 - July 16, 2007) was an American hurdler who finished fourth in the Men's 400 metres hurdles at the 1948 Summer Olympics. He set a 440-yard hurdle world record of 52.2 on August 31, 1949 at Bislett Stadion in Oslo, Norway. He attended Roosevelt High School in St. Louis, Missouri. Ault participated in track and field at the University of Missouri and had a second-place finish in the intermediates at the 1949 AAU. He won the Big 6 220-yard low hurdles in 1946 and 1947 and the Big 7 low hurdles in 1948 and 1949. Ault was the conference champion in the 440-yard dash in 1947 and 1949. He taught at Highland Park High School, where he led the cross-country team to a state championship, and later became a physical education professor at Westminster College. He also coached track, cross-country, swimming, and golf at Westminster. He was inducted into the Missouri Sports Hall of Fame in 1993. He is also a member of the University of Missouri Hall of Fame and the National High School Sports Hall of Fame.

References

1925 births
2007 deaths
American male hurdlers
Missouri Tigers men's track and field athletes
Olympic track and field athletes of the United States
Athletes (track and field) at the 1948 Summer Olympics
Westminster College (Missouri) faculty
Schoolteachers from Illinois
Track and field athletes from St. Louis
20th-century American educators
Westminster Blue Jays track and field coaches